The UK Singles Chart is a music chart compiled by the Official Charts Company that calculates the best-selling singles of the week in the United Kingdom. During the 1990s the chart was based purely on the sales of physical singles, with airplay figures excluded from the official chart.

At the beginning of the 1990s, sales of singles and albums in the United Kingdom were compiled on behalf of the British music industry by Gallup. This continued until 1994, when the contract to compile the UK charts was won by Millward Brown, who took over on 1 February 1994. On 1 July 1998 Chart Information Network (CIN) took over the management of the chart: CIN changed their name to the Official UK Charts Company in October 2001, later shortened to the Official Charts Company in 2008.

Unlike other decades, no decade-end charts for the 1990s for either singles or albums were broadcast on BBC Radio 1 at the end of 1999, and no detailed lists were published in the UK music trade magazine Music Week. Gallup's sales figures were not made available to its successors, and Millward Brown's sales data from 1994 to 1996 were later substantially revised. This made it difficult to obtain accurate sales figures for the decade. Two weeks before the end of the decade Music Week published lists of the top twenty best-selling singles and albums of the 1990s in the UK. Both top twenty lists included sales figures, but the subsequent revisions of the data have made the original 1999 figures unreliable.

The 19 September 2009 issue of the UK music trade magazine Music Week included a special supplement to celebrate its 50th anniversary. It contained updated charts of the top twenty best-selling singles of each decade of the magazine's existence, based on the most recent information available from the OCC. The following chart is therefore the most up to date estimate of the top twenty best-selling singles of the 1990s.

Between 1990 and 1999, 26 singles sold more than 1 million copies in the United Kingdom. British singer-songwriter Elton John had the best-selling single of the decade with his double A-side single "Candle in the Wind 1997"/"Something About the Way You Look Tonight", released in 1997. The single sold 4.86 million copies, over 3 million copies more than the second biggest-seller, "Unchained Melody"/"(There'll Be Bluebirds Over) The White Cliffs of Dover" by Robson & Jerome. At number five is Cher with "Believe", the best-selling single of all-time by a female artist in the UK.

Chart

Note: All the singles in this list reached number 1 on the UK Singles Chart.

References

1990s in British music
British music-related lists
1990s